Christopher Kevin Glass (Ph.D., M.D.) (born 1955, California, USA) is a biophysicist, holding the titles of Distinguished Professor of Cellular and Molecular Medicine and Distinguished Professor of Medicine at the University of California, San Diego He works on the molecular mechanisms that control macrophage functions in health and disease.

Glass majored in Biophysics at the University of California, Berkeley (1977) and received M.D. and Ph.D. degrees from the University of California, San Diego (1984). He performed internship and residency training in internal medicine at Brigham and Women's Hospital in Boston (1985) before returning to UC San Diego for fellowship training in Endocrinology and Metabolism (1989).   He became one of the founding members of the Department of Cellular and Molecular Medicine  In 1992 he was appointed 
Assistant Professor of Medicine at UCSD, and promoted to Associate Professor in 1995, full professor in 1999, and Distinguished Professor in 2018 

Glass is a member of the American Academy of Arts and Sciences, the National Academy of Medicine, and the National Academy of Sciences.

Research interests
Recent work from the laboratory reported the importance of tissue-specific signals in establishing the diverse macrophage phenotypes observed in different organs including microglia, the major macrophage population in the brain.

Awards and honors
 1989 Wilson S. Stone Award for the M.D. Andersen Cancer Center
 2008 Honorary Doctorate of Medicine, University of Linköping, Sweden
 2014 Election to American Academy of Arts and Sciences 
 2015 Election to National Academy of Medicine (formerly Institute of Medicine) 
 2017 Election to National Academy of Sciences

Most cited publications
Glass has an h-index of over 100. His most cited publications are:
 – Cited 6487 times according to Google Scholar.
 – Cited 4118 times according to Google Scholar.
 – Cited 3831 times according to Google Scholar.

References

External links
Glass Laboratory webpage

American biophysicists
1955 births
Living people
Members of the National Academy of Medicine
Members of the United States National Academy of Sciences
Members of the American Academy of Arts and Letters